Karl Yune (born April 16, 1975) is an American actor. He is best known for his role as Maseo Yamashiro in the DC comics TV franchise Arrow, as Tak Mashido in the sci-fi film Real Steel, and as Koichi in the film Memoirs of a Geisha. His first lead role was in the cult thriller Anacondas: The Hunt for the Blood Orchid, as Tran.

Early life
Yune, a Korean American, was born and raised in Washington, D.C., the son of Yun Taeho and Park Wonhui. Yune was educated at Georgetown Preparatory School, an American Jesuit college preparatory school, one of the most selective and oldest all-boys school in the United States.  Yune studied business, literature, and philosophy before he switched to a major in theater at Columbia University School of the Arts in New York after winning the role of Romeo for a presentation of Romeo and Juliette.

Career
Yune got his first lead role in a studio film as Tran, one of the guides in Anacondas: The Hunt for the Blood Orchid.  He has also appeared in Forbidden Warrior, and Memoirs of a Geisha, as well as in the short films Miracle Mile (which received several awards), and Hold Up.  He also acted in various Off-Broadway plays, and has done fashion modeling. Yune appears in the third season of Arrow as Maseo Yamashiro, (the Arrow's friend and mentor) who later becomes 2nd in command of the League of Assassins, and is also married to Katana, aka Tatsu Yamashiro.

Karl Yune is sometimes credited as Carl Yune and Karl Hahn (as in Miracle Mile).

Personal life
He is the younger brother of actor Rick Yune. Yune currently resides in Los Angeles.

Filmography

Film

Television

Video games

References

External links

American male film actors
American male stage actors
American male television actors
Male models from Washington, D.C.
American male actors of Korean descent
Columbia University School of the Arts alumni
Male actors from Washington, D.C.
Living people
1975 births
21st-century American male actors
Georgetown Preparatory School alumni